Ayuk Otay Arrey Sophina (born 3 January 1994) is a Cameroonian judoka. She won one of the bronze medals in the women's 70 kg event at the 2019 African Games held in Rabat, Morocco. She competed in the women's 70 kg event at the 2020 Summer Olympics held in Tokyo, Japan.

Career 

In 2019, she won one of the bronze medals in the women's 70 kg event at the African Judo Championships held in Cape Town, South Africa.

In 2020, she won the silver medal in this event at the African Judo Championships held in Antananarivo, Madagascar.

Prior to the 2020 Tokyo Olympic Games, she was living and training in Rouen, France.

Achievements

References

External links 

 

Living people
1994 births
Place of birth missing (living people)
Cameroonian female judoka
African Games medalists in judo
African Games bronze medalists for Cameroon
Competitors at the 2019 African Games
Judoka at the 2020 Summer Olympics
Olympic judoka of Cameroon
21st-century Cameroonian women